Flamingo Air is a small, charter airline that operates flights from Cincinnati, Ohio's Lunken Airport.

History
The airline was set up in 1991 by a group of friends who dared each other to get at least one couple to pay for sex during flight.

Operations
The airline claims to operate an average of eight flights per day.

The company also has a flight academy for future pilots.

Destinations
Flamingo Air's flights are one-hour flights that operate over the city of Cincinnati.

Fleet
1 Piper Cherokee 6
1 Piper Cherokee Cruiser (flight school only)
1 Piper Arrow (flight school only)
1 Cessna 172 (flight school only)

References

External links
Flamingo Air Academy

Airlines established in 1991
Companies based in Cincinnati
1991 establishments in Ohio